Norbert Meier (born 20 September 1958) is a German former football player, who played as a midfielder, and manager who last managed KFC Uerdingen.

Playing career
Meier's career as a player was spent mostly at SV Werder Bremen where he played first team football from 1980–1990. During this time he also made 16 appearances for West Germany in midfield scoring twice.

Meier ended his playing days at Borussia Mönchengladbach, where he played two and a half years.

Coaching career

Borussia Mönchengladbach
Meier started his coaching career by taking over the reserve side of Borussia Mönchengladbach on 1 July 1996. Meier coached them until 30 November 1997. Meier coached the senior squad between 1 December 1997 and 1 April 1998. Meier rejoined the reserve team on 1 July 1998.

MSV Duisburg
Meier officially took over for MSV Duisburg on 1 January 2003. Meier is most recently noted as coach at MSV Duisburg when he lost his temper in their match against 1. FC Köln on 6 December 2005. In the 82nd minute, Meier was arguing with Köln's Albert Streit when Meier suddenly fell down. Referee Manuel Gräfe sent Streit off with a red card. After the incident was reviewed on television, it became clear that it had not been Streit who hit Meier, but that Meier was play-acting. In fact, Meier had given Streit a headbutt. The club sacked Meier on 8 December 2005. The German FA banned him for three months from any management activities on 15 December 2005.

Dynamo Dresden
Dynamo Dresden presented Meier as the new manager on 10 September 2006. Meier was sacked on 24 September 2007.

Fortuna Düsseldorf
Fortuna Düsseldorf hired Meier on 1 January 2008. Meier was sacked after being relegated after the 2012–13 season.

Arminia Bielefeld
Meier took over Arminia Bielefeld on 24 February 2014.

Darmstadt 98
He was appointed as the new head coach of Darmstadt 98 on 10 June 2016. On 5 December 2016, he was sacked.

1. FC Kaiserslautern
On 3 January 2017, Meier was appointed as manager of 1. FC Kaiserslautern. He signed a contract until June 2018. Meier was sacked on 20 September 2017.

KFC Uerdingen
Meier took over KFC Uerdingen on 3 February 2019. He was sacked on 15 March 2019.

Managerial statistics

Honours

Player
Werder Bremen
Bundesliga: 1987–88; runner-up: 1982–83, 1984–85, 1985–86
DFB-Pokal finalist: 1988–89, 1989–90
DFL-Supercup: 1988

Borussia Mönchengladbach
DFB-Pokal finalist: 1991–92

Manager
Individual
 3. Liga Manager of the Year: 2014–15

References

External links

1958 births
Living people
People from Stormarn (district)
Footballers from Schleswig-Holstein
German footballers
Germany international footballers
Germany B international footballers
German football managers
Bundesliga players
2. Bundesliga players
SV Werder Bremen players
Borussia Mönchengladbach players
UEFA Euro 1984 players
Arminia Bielefeld managers
Borussia Mönchengladbach managers
MSV Duisburg managers
Dynamo Dresden managers
Fortuna Düsseldorf managers
Bundesliga managers
2. Bundesliga managers
SV Darmstadt 98 managers
1. FC Kaiserslautern managers
KFC Uerdingen 05 managers
Association football midfielders
3. Liga managers